Branchville station is a commuter rail station on the Danbury Branch of the Metro-North Railroad New Haven Line, located in the Branchville neighborhood of Ridgefield, Connecticut.

History

Ridgefield opened in 1852 as an original station on the Danbury and Norwalk Railroad. The name was changed to Branchville upon the 1870 opening of the Ridgefield Branch. A new station building was built around 1887 and served until the current station house was built in 1905. The building is currently occupied by the Whistle Stop Bakery, which opened in the 1980s. The Ridgefield Branch was used for passenger service until 1925 and for freight service until 1964.

Station layout
The station has one three-car-long high-level side platform to the west of the single track. A  passing siding extends north from the station.

The station has 168 parking spaces, is owned by the Connecticut Department of Transportation (ConnDOT), and managed by the town, but Metro-North is responsible for trash removal.

References

External links

Connecticut Department of Transportation, "Condition Inspection Branchville Station" report, September 2002

Stations along New York, New Haven and Hartford Railroad lines
Metro-North Railroad stations in Connecticut
Railroad stations in Fairfield County, Connecticut
Buildings and structures in Ridgefield, Connecticut
Railway stations in the United States opened in 1852
1852 establishments in Connecticut